Claudio Júlio Tognolli (born 1963) is a Brazilian journalist, musician and writer. He is a professor of journalism at the School of Communications and Arts of the University of São Paulo (Escola de Comunicações e Artes da Universidade de São Paulo, ECA/USP) and a board member at the Associação Brasileira de Jornalismo Investigativo.

He started his reporting career at Veja magazine. He followed with work on the newspapers Folha de S.Paulo, Jornal da Tarde, and on magazines Caros Amigos, Rolling Stone Brasil, Galileu, Joyce Pascowitch and Consultor Juridico. He has worked also at radio stations CBN, Jovem Pan and Eldorado. He was a co-founder of the news site Brasil 247.

His latest book, Assassinato de Reputações, released on 11 December 2014, sold 120,000 copies in four months.

In April 2014, Tognolli was hired by Yahoo! to write an investigative journalism blog.

Bibliography
 O Século do Crime (The Century of Crime)  with José Arbex Jr. (Boitempo).  
 O Mundo Pós-Moderno (The Post-Modern World) (Scipione, 1997).
 A Sociedade dos Chavões (Escrituras). 
 Falácia Genética: a Ideologia do DNA (Genetic Fallacy: the DNA ideology) (Escrituras, 2003). 
 Mídia, Máfias and Rock n Roll (Editora do Bispo, 2007)
 50 anos a mil, a biography of Lobão (Nova Fronteira/Ediouro, 2010)
 Milton Neves, uma biografia (Lazuli/Companhia Editora Nacional, 2013)
 Assassinato de Reputações (Topbooks, 2014)
 Ex-Agente Abre a Caixa Preta da ABIN (Escrituras, 2016)
 Assassinato de Reputações II - Muito Além da Lava Jato (Matrix, 2016)

References

External links
 Tognolli's Blog at Yahoo!
 Claudio Tognolli's AOL column
 Claudio Tognolli's web page

Living people
Brazilian people of Italian descent
Brazilian journalists
1963 births
Academic staff of the University of São Paulo